The Lambert House is a historic house at 204 West Jackson Street in Monticello, Arkansas.  The Colonial Revival house was built in 1905 to a design by noted local architect S. C. Hotchkiss.  It was built for Walter Lambert, who owned one of Monticello's first grocery stores.  The two-story wood-frame house is roughly rectangular in shape, with projecting gable sections and a rear ell.  Its main facade is dominated by a two-story portico, whose second story has been enclosed as a sunroom.  The lower portion of the portico is supported by granite columns, and the entablature is supported by Ionic columns, which are still visible despite the sunroom conversion.

Also known as Miles House, it was listed on the National Register of Historic Places in 1983.

See also
National Register of Historic Places listings in Drew County, Arkansas

References

Houses on the National Register of Historic Places in Arkansas
Colonial Revival architecture in Arkansas
Houses completed in 1905
Houses in Drew County, Arkansas
National Register of Historic Places in Drew County, Arkansas
1905 establishments in Arkansas